is a passenger railway station located in the city of Tokushima, Tokushima Prefecture, Japan. It is operated by JR Shikoku and has the station number "T02".

Lines
Yoshinari Station is served by the JR Shikoku Kōtoku Line and is located 68.2 km from the beginning of the line at Takamatsu. Only trains from local services stop at the station. These trains also stop at Yoshinari.

Layout
The station consists of two side platforms serving two tracks. The station building is unstaffed and serves only as a waiting room. Access to the opposite platform is by means of a footbridge. A siding runs on the other side of platform 2.

Platforms

Adjacent stations

History
The station was opened by the privately run Awa Electric Railway (later the Awa Railway) on 1 July 1916. After the Awa Railway was nationalized on 1 July 1933, Japanese Government Railways (JGR) took over control of the station and operated it as part of the Awa Line. On 20 March 1935, the station became part of the Kōtoku Main Line. With the privatization of JNR on 1 April 1987, the station came under the control of JR Shikoku.

Passenger statistics
In fiscal 2019, the station was used by an average of 326 passengers daily

Surrounding area
Seikoen Junior and Senior High School, 
Seikouen Elementary School, 
Ojin Junior High School, 
Ojin Elementary School,

See also
 List of Railway Stations in Japan

References

External links

 JR Shikoku timetable

Railway stations in Tokushima Prefecture
Railway stations in Japan opened in 1916
Tokushima (city)